Georg Wunderlich (31 October 1893 – 27 May 1963) was a German footballer who played as a forward and made five appearances for the Germany national team.

References

1893 births
1963 deaths
Association football forwards
German footballers
Germany international footballers
Stuttgarter Kickers players